Luge at the 1988 Winter Olympics consisted of three events at Canada Olympic Park.  The competition took place between 14 and 19 February 1988.

Medal summary

Medal table

East Germany won all three gold medals, and six medals overall. All three countries that won medals in Calgary were participating in their last Winter Olympics, the two Germanys unifying and the Soviet Union splitting up before 1992.

Events

Participating NOCs
Twenty-three nations participated in Luge at the Calgary Games. The Netherlands Antilles, Bulgaria, the Philippines and the US Virgin Islands made their Olympic luge debuts.

References

 
1988
1988 Winter Olympics events
1988 in luge
International luge competitions hosted by Canada